Robert Searles may refer to:
 Robert Searle, English buccaneer
 Robert L. Searles, American businessman and politician